Algapur Assembly constituency is one of the 126 Assembly constituencies in Hailakandi district in the North-East Indian state of Assam.

Overview
As per orders of the Delimitation Commission, No. 8 Algapur Assembly constituency is composed of circle No. 1 in Hailakandi Police Station in Hailakandi Sub-Division; and circle Nos. 23 and 24 in Silchar Police Station in Silchar Sub-Division.

Town Details

Country: India.
 State: Assam.
 District: Barak Valley region and Hailakandi district of Assam.
 Lok Sabha Constituency: Karimganj Lok Sabha/Parliamentary constituency.
 Assembly Categorisation: Rural
 Literacy Level: 75.26%.
 Eligible Electors as per 2021 General Elections: 1,63,049 Eligible Electors. Male Electors:85,905. Female Electors:77,140.
 Geographic Co-Ordinates: 24°44’31.9"N 92°35’45.6"E.
 Total Area Covered: 277 square kilometres.
 Area Includes:Circle No. 1 in Hailakandi thana in Hailakandi sub-division; and circle Nos. 23 and 24 in Silchar thana in Silchar sub-division of  Hailakandi district of Assam.
 Inter State Border :Hailakandi.
 Number Of Polling Stations: Year 2011–170,Year 2016–177,Year 2021–8.

Members of Legislative Assembly

Election results

2016 results

2013 by-election result

See also
 Algapur
Hailakandi District
 List of constituencies of Assam Legislative Assembly

References

External links 
 

Assembly constituencies of Assam